Senator Triplett may refer to:

Constance Triplett (born 1950s), North Dakota State Senate
George Washington Triplett (1809–1894), Kentucky State Senate